Wherwell railway station served the village of Wherwell, Hampshire, England, from 1885 to 1956 on the Fullerton to Hurstbourne Line.

History 
The station opened on 1 June 1885 by the London and South Western Railway. The station closed to passengers on 6 July 1931 and to goods traffic in 1956.

References 

Disused railway stations in Hampshire
Former London and South Western Railway stations
Railway stations in Great Britain opened in 1885
Railway stations in Great Britain closed in 1931
1885 establishments in England
1956 disestablishments in England